Higher education institutions in the United Arab Emirates need to be recognized by the Commission for Academic Accreditation (CAA), which falls under the Ministry of Education. While the Ministry of Education is the federal governing body for higher education and education in general, some emirates might still have their own agencies which oversee certain aspects of higher education within the emirate, such as Dubai's Knowledge and Human Development Authority (KHDA) or Abu Dhabi's Department of Education and Knowledge (ADEK).

Only institutions that have received CAA accreditation from the Ministry of Education are listed below.

List of universities and colleges

International rankings 
These are the universities' rankings in 2019 according to THE (Times Higher Education) and in 2020 according to QS (Quacquarelli Symonds). Definitions of categories used for measurement of both THE and QS are missing. It would be helpful if the UAE provided its own rankings according to its own measurement system. The Tuning Project 2000 is integrated in the THE rankings in order to accommodate local and cultural diversity and to ameliorate against rankings with 'Western' bias.

Institutions located within free zones 
The Ministry of Education does not recognize educational institutions based in free zones. While individual Emirates are responsible for managing the standards of educational institutions within their free zones, Dubai is the only Emirate that does so through the Knowledge and Human Development Authority's (KHDA) University Quality Assurance International Board. The Emirate of Ras Al Khaimah is currently working on tightening rules and regulations that govern higher academic institutions within free zones in the Emirate.

See also 
 Commission for Academic Accreditation
 Dubai International Academic City
 Education in the United Arab Emirates
 Knowledge and Human Development Authority
 List of schools in the United Arab Emirates
 Ministry of Education

References

United Arab Emirates education-related lists

United Arab Emirates

Education in Dubai
United Arab Emirates
universities